Cerithidea obtusa is a species of sea snail, a marine gastropod mollusk in the family Potamididae. The Obtuse Horn Shell, also known as Mud Creeper, is a relatively common snail found in muddy coastal areas. It grows to around 5–6 cm. It is used as a food in Southeast Asia, where it is known by the name of Belitung and Siput Sedut in Malay, Hoi Joob Jaeng, and Ốc Len in Vietnamese.

It can crawl up to a height of 7 metres, where, once it reaches the highest point on a tree, it will then jump off the tree trunk and fall back onto the mud.

Many South East Asians have been observed eating the mud creeper as a dish, particularly in Malaysia, southern Thailand, certain parts of Indonesia, and Vietnam.

Distribution

References

External links

Potamididae
Taxa named by Jean-Baptiste Lamarck
Gastropods described in 1822